Anacithara janjukiensis is an extinct species of sea snail, a marine gastropod mollusk in the family Horaiclavidae.

Description
The length of this shell attains 8 mm, its diameter 3.5 mm.

Distribution
This extinct marine species occurred off Tasmania in Lower Miocene strata.

References

 Maxwell, P.A. (2009). Cenozoic Mollusca. pp. 232–254 in Gordon, D.P. (ed.) New Zealand inventory of biodiversity. Volume one. Kingdom Animalia: Radiata, Lophotrochozoa, Deuterostomia. Canterbury University Press, Christchurch.

External links

janjukiensis
Gastropods of Australia
Gastropods described in 1942